Wrack & Roll is a novel by Bradley Denton published in 1986.

Plot summary
Wrack & Roll is a novel in which the Anglo-Chinese Alliance opposes the US/USSR in an alternate 1979.

Reception
Dave Langford reviewed Wrack & Roll for White Dwarf #94, and stated that "Can the force of music halt nuclear apocalypse? Only via unconvincing plot devices, but it's a good rousing read. Very Norman Spinrad."

Reviews
Review by Faren Miller (1986) in Locus, #309 October 1986
Review by Constance Ash (1986) in Fantasy Review, November 1986
Review by Don D'Ammassa (1987) in Science Fiction Chronicle, #98 November 1987

References

1986 novels